Benjamin Lambot (born May 2, 1987) is a Belgian professional footballer who plays as a defender for RFC Liège.

Career
In January 2012, Lambot announced that he would be joining Lierse from Royal Antwerp during the summer transfer window on a free transfer. In January 2014 Lambot signed a one-year contract with the option of a second with Simurq. In December 2014, Lambot extended his Simurq contract until the end of the 2014–15 season.

In 2020, NorthEast United signed Lambot for the 2020–21 Indian Super League season on a one year deal. He scored 2 goals in 21 appearances for the Highlander.

Career statistics

References

External links

1987 births
Living people
Association football midfielders
Belgian footballers
Belgian expatriate footballers
A.F.C. Tubize players
R.E. Virton players
Royal Antwerp F.C. players
Lierse S.K. players
Simurq PIK players
Cercle Brugge K.S.V. players
NorthEast United FC players
Nea Salamis Famagusta FC players
RFC Liège players
Belgian Pro League players
Challenger Pro League players
Indian Super League players
Azerbaijan Premier League players
Cypriot First Division players
Expatriate footballers in Azerbaijan
Expatriate footballers in Cyprus
Expatriate footballers in India
Belgian expatriate sportspeople in India
People from Florennes
Footballers from Namur (province)